Guitar Hero World Tour is the fourth major release in the Guitar Hero series of music video games, a series that has sold over 24 million units and earned more than $1.6 billion in retail sales.  The game was released in October 2008 for the PlayStation 2, PlayStation 3, Wii, and Xbox 360 game consoles in North America, and a month later for PAL regions.  It was released in Europe and on a limited basis in North America for the Microsoft Windows and Apple Macintosh platforms.  The game was developed by Neversoft, with assistance from Vicarious Visions and Budcat Creations for the Wii and PlayStation 2 versions, respectively, and distributed by RedOctane and Activision.   Guitar Hero World Tour, like the other games in the Guitar Hero series, focuses on the use of special game controllers to mimic musical tracks from popular rock songs that date from the 1960s to contemporary hits.  While previous versions of the series have only used a guitar-based controller for lead and bass guitar tracks, World Tour adds in drums and vocals, allowing up to four players to create a virtual band.  For each instrument, the player scores points by matching controller actions with note gems on the game screen to avoid a bad performance that may end the song prematurely.  In addition to the on-disk songs, the PlayStation 3, Xbox 360, and Wii versions support the ability to obtain new songs through downloadable content. A new music creation system also allows users on the same systems to gain new user-created songs through the game's "GHTunes" service.

Main setlist
The game disc contains 86 songs, all of which are master recordings—a first for the Guitar Hero series.  In the single player and multiplayer band (Career Mode) modes, songs are distributed into various "gigs" that contain between 3 and 6 songs each; gigs may also contain a boss battle (for the single player guitar career) and encores that are revealed once all the other songs in the gig are completed.  These gigs are arranged approximately based on the difficulty of the songs in that gig for the selected instrument or band, with more difficult songs appearing in later gigs.  The player or band must complete easier gigs before the more difficult gigs are available.  Once a player or band has access to a song via any instrument or band Career mode, that song can be played in Quickplay mode or any of the other competitive modes in the game.  The set list has been described as containing well-known songs by "an impressive collection of artists" such as Van Halen, Jimi Hendrix, Joe Satriani, and Tool, as well as a considerable number of tracks from European bands.
below with the year they were recorded (based on the in-game description), song title, and artist, and the placement of the song in the band career mode. 38 out of the 86 songs are exportable to both Guitar Hero 5 and Band Hero for a small fee, with music licensing limiting which songs can be exported. More songs may be made exportable at a later time.

Downloadable content
In addition to custom songs, players of the Xbox 360, PlayStation 3, and Wii versions could download new licensed songs for the game. However, on March 31, 2014, Activision removed this content from being downloadable and there is no evidence it will become available again.

This was the first game in the Guitar Hero series to support download functionality on the Wii. Wii users can store downloaded songs on either the Wii's internal memory or on an SD Card in a "Rock Archive". When playing tracks stored on an SD Card, each song is automatically copied to a 200-memory block "content cache" on the Wii's flash memory for play and then deleted after the song is finished.  Some downloadable content was not available for the Wii due to technical or licensing issues until November 24, 2009. Except for the Jimi Hendrix songs, the downloadable content is forward-compatible with Guitar Hero 5, Band Hero and Guitar Hero: Warriors of Rock, automatically updated to include new features found in those games.

Downloadable songs were available for individual purchase on PlayStation 3, Wii and Xbox 360, with a limited number of songs available free of charge. Also, users could purchase track packs of three songs. The Jimi Hendrix Track Pack was originally only available for download as a track pack and not as individual songs, but Activision announced that in March the Wii would receive the Hendrix pack as downloadable singles.  These songs have since been released with the second Jimi Hendrix Track Pack.

References

World Tour